Efrén Pérez Rivera (March 10, 1929 – May 15, 2011) was a Puerto Rican environmentalist leader and college professor. He got married at the age of 28 with Pezinka Berenguer, till the day he died. He had three children with her, Efrén Pérez Berenguer, Manuel Pérez Berenguer, and José Luis Pérez Berenguer

Biography

Efrén Pérez Rivera was born on March 10, 1929, at Mayagüez, Puerto Rico, where he lived during his first years.  At the age of four, he moved with his family to Cabo Rojo, Puerto Rico. He attended the College of Agriculture and Mechanical Arts (known today as the University of Puerto Rico at Mayagüez), obtaining a bachelor's degree in biology in 1952.  Pérez later became a professor of biology and chemistry at the Peñuelas High School.

Pérez did his obligatory military service in the U.S. Army during the Korean War, during which he was stationed in Hawaii.

In 1953, he worked at the Agricultural Experimental Station at both Isabela and Lajas.  He later obtained a master's degree in environmental health from the Tropical School of Medicine at San Juan.

Community involvement

During the 1960s, Pérez became a member of Cabo Rojo's Credit and Savings Cooperative( Cooperativa de Ahorro y Crédito de Cabo Rojo) and joined its Education Committee.  As a member of this committee, he visited the communities of Cabo Rojo and worked to make the public aware of the philosophy and advantages of the cooperative movement.  Also, he was the president of the Supervision Committee.  During the first half of the 1970s, he worked in the Cooperative Development Administration.  In December 1977 he obtained a master's degree in Horticulture from the University of Puerto Rico at Mayagüez.  He then went on to become a professor in the College of Agricultural Science from that institution.  During this time, he also took an active role in the organization of Cabo Rojo's Cooperative Pharmacy (Farmacia Cooperativa de Cabo Rojo) and became the president of its board of directors.

In 1983 he became the president of the Puerto Rican Independence Party's (PIP) Cabo Rojo committee.  In 1988, under his presidency, the party obtained the largest percentage of local votes for the governor's seat in the history of Cabo Rojo (11.2%).  He also obtained the largest percentage of votes for a district representative seat, compared with the rest of his fellow candidates.

His knowledge and convictions led him to join the environmental crusades against the Adjuntas copper mines, the construction of Club Med in Guánica, the installation of a Voice of America transmitter in Cabo Rojo, the construction of the Cogentrix carbon-based electrical plant in Mayagüez, amongst others.

In 1990 Pérez organized Caborrojeños Pro Salud y Ambiente This organization was designed to encourage and promote the well-being, the conservation of natural resources and the sustainable economic development of the Cabo Rojo region.  Caborrojeños pro Salud y Ambiente along with United States Fish and Wildlife Service were the primary promoters of a research and visitors center located at the Cabo Rojo salt mines. The center is named Centro Intepretativo Las Salinas De Cabo Rojo don Efrén Pérez Rivera in his honor.

In a joint venture with the Puerto Rico Department of Natural and Environmental Resources, the committee had a major role in the restoration project of Isla de Ratones, a small key by the coast of Cabo Rojo that is rapidly losing its surface area due to erosion. Pérez has occupied the presidency of Caborrojeños pro Salud y Ambiente several times from its inception through 2005 when he was succeeded by fellow professor Pedro Valle Carlo.  Pérez died on May 15, 2011.

Awards and recognitions

Pérez has been recognized by several institutions and organization for his civic work and pro-environment values.  Some of the institutions and organizations that have recognized his work are:

 The University of Puerto Rico
 The Ana G. Mendez University System
 Jornada de Betances
 Cooperativa de Ahorro y Credito de Cabo Rojo
 Farmacia Cooperativa de Cabo Rojo
 The municipal government of Cabo Rojo
 The Puerto Rico Tourism Company
 The United States Fish and Wildlife Service

Pérez has also received several awards, including:

1999 - Public Awareness Award, Conferencia de Bosque de Puerto Rico
2000 - Environmental Award, Universidad Interamericana of San Germán
2003 - Environmental Quality Award, Environmental Protection Agency (E.P.A.)
2005 - Named part of the E.P.A.'s Environmental Justice Advisory Council

See also
 List of Puerto Ricans

References

External links
 Bio Page at Pro Ambiente Puerto Rico (In Spanish)''

1929 births
2011 deaths
Puerto Rican scientists
People from Mayagüez, Puerto Rico
United States Army soldiers